The Klamath Lake sculpin (Cottus princeps) is a species of freshwater ray-finned fish belonging to the family Cottidae, the typical sculpins. It is endemic to the United States. It is endemic to the Agency and Upper Klamath Lakes in Oregon. It reaches a maximum length of 7.0 cm. It prefers rocky and sandy shores of the lakes.

References

Fauna of the United States
Cottus (fish)
Fish described in 1898
Taxonomy articles created by Polbot
Taxa named by Charles Henry Gilbert